Jack Croft (born 21 December 2000) is a professional rugby league footballer who plays as a  for Wynnum Manly Seagulls in the Queensland Cup.

Croft has previously time on loan at Oldham RLFC (Heritage № 1422).

Playing career

Wakefield Trinity
In 2019 he made his Challenge Cup début for Wakefield against St Helens.

Oldham
On 28 Apr 2021 it was reported that he had signed for Oldham in the RFL Championship on a season-long loan.

References

External links
Wakefield Trinity profile
SL profile

2000 births
Living people
Barrow Raiders players
English rugby league players
Newcastle Thunder players
Oldham R.L.F.C. players
Rugby league players from Keighley
Rugby league wingers
Wakefield Trinity players
Wynnum Manly Seagulls players